Surveyor General of Tasmania is a position originally created for the colony of Van Diemens Land (Tasmania from 1855 now a state of Australia).

List of Surveyors General of Tasmania

See also
 Surveyor General of New South Wales
 Surveyor General of Queensland
 Surveyor General of South Australia
 Surveyor General of the Northern Territory
 Surveyor General of Victoria
 Surveyor General of Western Australia

References

Lists of British, Australian and New Zealand Surveyors-General, Government Geologists...
Australian Dictionary of Biography Surveyor-General search

Government of Tasmania